Pasiphila dryas is a moth in the family Geometridae. It is endemic to New Zealand.

Adults are on wing in December and January.

The forewings are dull rosy brown with numerous obscure blackish transverse lines. The hindwings are grey, tinged with rosy brown with numerous very faint blackish transverse lines.

References

Moths described in 1891
dryas
Moths of New Zealand
Endemic fauna of New Zealand
Taxa named by Edward Meyrick